Atlético Juventud Girardot was a Colombian football (soccer) team, based in Girardot, Colombia. The club was founded in Soacha in 2007 as Atlético Juventud Soacha, before it relocated in 2010. The club was dissolved the same year after it sold its licence to Fortaleza F.C.

Notable players
  Alejandro Galindo (2009–10)

See also
Girardot F.C.

Football clubs in Colombia
2007 establishments in Colombia
Categoría Primera B clubs